Business diagram may refer to:
Flowcharts: Basic flowchart, Audit Flowcharts, Cause-Effect (Fishbone) Diagrams, cross-functional vertical and horizontal diagrams, data flow diagrams, opportunity flowchart, workflow diagram
Organizational Charts (Org charts)
Project management: Gantt chart, Project Schedules, PERT Charts, Calendar, Timelines
Comparison charts
Block diagrams and Bar Charts
Venn diagrams, other marketing diagrams
Business Processes
IDEF0 Diagram
TQM Diagram